Rinat Farkhoutdinov (born December 13, 1975) is a Russian-born ice dancer who competed internationally for Japan. With partner Nakako Tsuzuki, he is a three-time Japanese national champion and competed three times at the Four Continents and World Championships. They were unable to compete during the latter half of the 2001/2002 Olympic season due to an injury to Tsuzuki. Their partnership ended following that season. Farkhoutdinov moved to Euless, Texas where he began working as a coach and choreographer. He has coached Julia Golovina / Oleg Voiko, among others.

References

External links
 Tracings.net profile

Russian male ice dancers
Japanese male ice dancers
Living people
1975 births
Sportspeople from Perm, Russia
People from Euless, Texas